Yishuntun Airbase (alternatively Zhengjiatun) is a military air base located in Jilin, Northeast China. The airbase is a highly strategic location, being part of the Northern Theater Command, near the North Korean border.

History
Yishtuntun began undergoing an expansion in 2016, with one runway lengthened to 2,800 meters. Nearby troop garrison and rail connections were also expanded.

Operations
Yishtun became the third Chinese base to operate the Guizhou Soar Dragon.

References

Airports in Jilin
Chinese Air Force bases